Book of Shadows II is the second solo album by American musician Zakk Wylde. It was released on April 8, 2016, via Entertainment One Music.

Track listing

Charts

References

2016 albums
Zakk Wylde albums
E1 Music albums
Sequel albums